Yaw Moses (born 7 January 1999) is a Ghanaian footballer who plays as a midfielder for Portuguese side Arouca.

Career statistics

Club

Notes

References

1999 births
Living people
Ghanaian footballers
Association football midfielders
Charity Stars F.C. players
F.C. Arouca players
Liga Portugal 2 players
Campeonato de Portugal (league) players
Ghanaian expatriate footballers
Expatriate footballers in Portugal
Ghanaian expatriate sportspeople in Portugal